Captain King may refer to:

Bill King (Royal Navy officer) (1910–2012), submarine commander
Ernest King (1878–1956), United States Navy officer
Frank Ragan King (1884–1919), United States Navy officer
George King (Royal Navy officer) (1809–1891)
James King (Royal Navy officer) (1750–1784), who served with Captain James Cook
Norman King (Royal Navy officer) (1933–2013)
Philip Gidley King (1758–1808), settler of Norfolk Island and Governor of New South Wales
Phillip Parker King (1791–1856), explorer of Australia and Patagonia
Sir Richard King, 1st Baronet (1730–1806)
Sir Richard King, 2nd Baronet (1774–1834)